Ásahreppur is a municipality in Iceland.

Municipalities of Iceland